The Rebel Son is a 1938 British historical adventure film directed by Adrian Brunel and starring Harry Baur, Anthony Bushell and Roger Livesey. Patricia Roc also appears in her first screen role. It is a re-working by Alexander Korda of Granowski's 1936 French film adaptation of the Russian novel Taras Bulba by Russian classic writer Nikolai Gogol, set in the 17th century Ukraine.

It was also known by the alternative titles The Barbarian and the Lady or The Rebel Son of Taras Bulba.

Cast
 Harry Baur as Taras Bulba 
 Anthony Bushell as Andrei Bulba 
 Roger Livesey as Peter Bulba 
 Patricia Roc as Marina 
 Joan Gardner as Galka
 Frederick Culley as Prince Zammitsky 
 Bernard Miles as Polish Prisoner 
 Joe Cunningham as Sachka 
 Charles Farrell as Tovkatch 
 Stafford Hilliard as Stutterer 
 Ann Wemyss as Selima

References

Bibliography
 Low, Rachael. Filmmaking in 1930s Britain. George Allen & Unwin, 1985.
 Wood, Linda. British Films, 1927-1939. British Film Institute, 1986.

External links

1938 films
Films set in the 16th century
1930s historical adventure films
British black-and-white films
Films directed by Adrian Brunel
Films directed by Albert de Courville
Films set in Ukraine
Films based on Taras Bulba
Films scored by Ernst Toch
British remakes of French films
British historical adventure films
United Artists films
1930s English-language films
1930s British films